Pune Institute of Computer Technology, (or PICT)  is a private unaided engineering college located in Dhankawadi, Pune, India. It was established by the Society for Computer Technology and Research, SCTR in 1983. It offers degrees in Information Technology, Computer Engineering and Electronics and Telecommunication Engineering.

Accreditation
PICT was accredited by India's two major accreditation agencies - National Assessment and Accreditation Council [NAAC] and National Board of Accreditation [NBA].

Specializations and departments

Computer Engineering
 Head of Department: M. S. TAKLIKAR
 Undergraduate intake per year: 240
 Postgraduate intake per year: 52
The Bachelor of Engineering Program in Computer Engineering commenced from the academic year 1983–84. The Department is known for its excellent results and student placements. There are 10 well-equipped laboratories in the department. The Department has been pioneered as the first Post Graduate Department in Computer Engineering in the unaided Engineering Colleges in University of Pune; with first batch commencing in year 2000.
There are two shifts in this program, first consisting of 180 students and the other 60 students.

Electronics and Telecommunication Engineering
 Head of Department:  Dr. Mousami. V. Munot
 Undergraduate intake per year: 240
This program also consists of two shifts, consisting of 180 students in first shift and 60 students in second shift.
Established in 1995, this department has a lab with around 25 Texas and Motorola experimental kits. The E&TC department has won the "Best Department Award" in 2003 and 2004. In 2009–2010, the E&TC department had the highest MHT-CET cut-off in University of Pune of 178/200.

Information Technology Engineering
 Head of Department: A. M. Bagade
 Undergraduate intake per year: 180
PICT's Bachelor of Engineering Program in Information Technology began in 2001 with an intake capacity of 60 students. The current intake capacity is 180 students. It has a multimedia laboratory, operating system Laboratory and network laboratory along with the programming and project laboratories.

Degrees awarded 

The Bachelor of Engineering(B.E) degree is offered in all the aforementioned departments. ME degree is also offered by all departments. As PICT is affiliated with the University of Pune, the degrees are offered by the university.

Admissions 
The institute considers the MHT-CET and JEE-Main scores of students for admissions. Also students successfully completing Diploma from polytechnic institutes are eligible for admissions to direct second year. It is considered one of the most selective institutes to get into. There are also programs for students of non-residential Indians ([Non-resident Indian and person of Indian origin|NRIs]) in the college.

Campus and buildings 

The campus is located in Dhankawadi, a suburb of southern Pune. It is a totally urban campus. The hallmark of the 4 acre campus is the central sprawling lawn in front of main library, which is off limits to all the students and teachers.

The buildings in the campus are:
 Main building
 School of Management
 Canteen
 Boys hostel
 Girls hostel
 Workshop
 Guest House

Main Building 
The main building is the largest building on the campus. It consists of the administrative wing, Computer Engineering wing, Electronics and Telecommunication wing, IT wing and the main library. The building has classrooms, laboratories and staff rooms which are shared between the three undergraduate courses. The PICT library has a collection of books and subscriptions to journals. The library is accessible from 6 AM to 10 PM to students and is centrally located between the three academic wings. The whole of the Main Building has seamless Wi-Fi connectivity except the Lecture Hall Complex.

The boys and girls hostel have a combined capacity of 200 students and are located on the north of the campus. All the Hostels have LAN facilities, which facilitate seamless learning. The cafeteria serving mostly Indian cuisine is situated between the two hostels. The PICT basketball court is situated adjacent to the girls hostel building. Also there is a Student Activity Center(SAC) which has facilities for student recreation.

Extra-Curricular Activities 

Apart from academics, annual technical and cultural festivals are held such as,
 Impetus and concepts (INC 2014)
 PICT Robotics
 TEDxPICT
 Credenz - PICT IEEE Student Branch organized
 Scientia - PICT IET Student Chapter
 Pulzion - PICT ACM Student Chapter
 Abhivyaktee and Art Exhibition - PICT Art Circle. Cultural show by FE students.
 Addiction - Annual Cultural festival.
Impetus and Concepts, popularly known as INC, was initiated in 1990 and soon reached a stage where it created national and international interest. It won acclaim and industry stalwarts with vision recognized its importance and actively supported the event. Concepts is a national-level project competition, having students participating from colleges all over the country. 
Apart from technical events PICT's annual cultural event, ADDICTION, also takes place during the month of January.

PICT Art Circle 
With a Record of winning Best Organized Team 11 times, PICT Art Circle is an official Cultural group of PICT that represents college at various Cultural Events such as Mood Indigo and participates in Intercollegiate competitions such as Purushottam Karandak, Firodiya Karandak and Dajikaka Gadgil Karandak etc.

 PICT has won Purushottam Karandak in 2000,2015 and 2022 along with numerous prizes.
 Recently it has shown exemplary performance at Firodiya Karandak 2019 winning the 2nd Runner Up Position for one act play 'Naqab' in the same for the 3rd Time along with awards such as Best Writer, Actor, Set etc. and Best Organized Team, previously in 2005 and 2017.

Sports 
Basket Ball , Volley Ball , Table Tennis, Football

Rankings 
PICT was ranked 8th on the list of best Engineering College of India by the Edu-Rand Rankings in 2016. The survey was done jointly by Edu, an Indian company and Rand Corporation, a non-profit American thinktank.

Alumni 
Neha Narkhede - Co-founder and former CTO of Confluent. Co-author of Apache Kafka.

Niki Parmar - Co-author of Attention Is All You Need research paper, that introduced the concept of transformers in AI.

References

External links
 Official website
 Review of PICT by students
 Inspection of Affiliated Collegeshttp://sppudocs.unipune.ac.in/sites/circulars/Affiliation%20Circulars/regarding-overall-deficiencies-and-observation-11-12-15.pdf

Engineering colleges in Pune
Colleges affiliated to Savitribai Phule Pune University
Educational institutions established in 1983
1983 establishments in Maharashtra

mr:पुणे इन्स्टीत्यूट ऑफ कॉम्पुटर टेक्नोलॉजी